Sheri-D Wilson, CM D. Litt, (aka "The Mama of Dada") is a Canadian poet, spoken word artist, educator, speaker, producer and activist.

From 2018-2020, Sheri-D Wilson was Poet Laureate of Calgary. In 2019 Sheri-D was appointed one of the country’s highest honours, The Order of Canada, for her contributions as a spoken word Poet and her leadership in the spoken word community. In 2017, she received her Doctor of Letters—Honoris Causa from Kwantlen University. In 2015 Sheri-D was awarded with The City of Calgary Arts Award, for her contributions as an artist and community activist and was named, Best of Calgary many times.

In 2019, her play, "A Love Letter to Emily Carr," was produced by Handsome Alice Theatre in Calgary and published by Frontenac Press. Her collection, "A Book of Sensations," addresses our relationship with the earth.

Her 9th poetry collection, "OPEN LETTER: Woman Against Violence Against Women," tackles difficult terrain. Conceived from improvisation, this collage of poems culminates in a flood poem as the desecration of the earth is compared to the treatment of women. Throughout the work a drumbeat, a heartbeat, a healing chant pervades. "OPEN LETTER," was nominated for the Robert Kroetsch Poetry Award and the ReLit Award.

Her last collection, "Goddess Gone Fishing for a Map of the Universe," is the first poetry book to use QR codes that connect to video, audio, and interactive talk-back. Her collection, "Re:Zoom" (2005, Frontenac House), won the 2006 Stephan G. Stephansson Award for Poetry, and was shortlisted for the CanLit Award.

She has three Spoken Word CDs, and 4 award-winning VideoPoems including: Airplane Paula (2001), Spinsters Hanging in Trees (2002), all produced for BravoFACT.

A strong advocate for social change and community building in Sheri-D Wilson founded The Spoken Word Program at The Banff Centre for Arts and Creativity. She was director and faculty of that program (2005-2012). At which time Tanya Evanson took over as director of the program. Sheri-D Wilson also edited The Spoken Word Workbook: Inspiration from Poets who Teach in 2011 (CSWS/BCP), an educational tool for teaching and writing Spoken Word.

In 2012, she was featured in Chatelaine Magazine, in a story about the creative mind. A regular on CBC, In 2013, she was interviewed by Canadian icon Sheilah Rogers. In 2011 she was honored to be presented by The National Slam of Canada in “Legends of Spoken Word.” In 2009 CBC called her one of the Top 10 Poets in Canada. In 2003 she won the USA Heavyweight title for poetry, and in 2006 The National Slam of Canada presented her with the Poet of Honour Award. Of the beat tradition, in 1989 Sheri-D studied at Naropa University’s Jack Kerouac School of Disembodied Poetics, in Boulder, Colorado.

Her influences include Guillaume Apollinaire, T.S. Eliot, Diane di Prima, Anne Waldman and Allen Ginsberg.

Community
 Founded/ Artistic Director - Calgary Spoken Word Festival (2003-2020) 
 La Directrice Artistique - School of Thought:  Languages Lost & Found (2016)
 Founded/ Directed - The Spoken Word Program @ The Banff Centre (2005-2012)
 Produced - The National Slam of Canada (SpoCan) 2008
 Co-founded and organized the Vancouver Small Press Festival 1988-1990
 Co-founded and organized The Commercial Street Art Festival 1988-1990

Other awards
 City of Calgary Arts Award (2015) 
 CBC Top 10 Poets in Canada (2013)
 ffwd Readers’ Choice Award—Best Poet (2007-2012)
 Ted Talk (2009)
 CBC Arts Top 10 Poets in Canada (2009)
 Stephan G. Stephansson Award for Poetry (2006)
 Woman of Vision (2006) 
 2005 SpoCan Poet of Honour 
 USA Heavyweight Title - Bumbershoot (2003)
 AMPIA (2003, for best short or vignette)
 Gold Award at the Houston Film Festival (2003)
 Ace Award (2003)
 CBC Face-off (2002)
 Confessions, a jazz play, 5 Jessie Nominations (Vancouver, 1991)

Reading highlights
 Write Bloody North (2020, On-Line)
 JazzYYC with Quincy Troupe (2019, Calgary)
 The Blues Festival (special event) with Sheila Jordan (2018, 2020, Calgary)
 New—New Year’s Eve Poem @ Olympic Plaza (2019, Calgary)
 Denman Island Readers & Writers Festival (2018, Denman Island)
 Live at the Bolt—Shadbolt Gallery (2018, Burnaby BC)
 Marvellous Urbanities, Surrealist Poetry Night (2018, Toronto)
 Wordspell (2018, Toronto)
 Kerouac Vigo International Festival (2017, Vigo, Spain)
 When Words Collide (2017, Victoria)
 League of Canadian Poets AGM (2017, Toronto)
 Saskatchewan Festival of Words (2017, Moose Jaw)
 Word on the Lake (2017, Salmon Arm)
 Yukon Writers Festival (2017, Whitehorse)
 Women’s March on Washington (2017, Calgary)
 Word on the Street (2015, Saskatoon)
 Sunshine Coast Festival of the Written Arts (2015, Sechelt) 
 Verses Fest (2015, Ottawa)
 Women’s Rape Centre Montreal Memorial (2014, Vancouver)
 llega Spoken Orality (2014, Barcelona)
 National Slam Feature (2014, Victoria)
 VI Festival de Poesía las Lenguas de América (2014, Mexico City)
 Feature Guest, The Emerald Awards - Performer 2014 (Calgary)
 Verses Poetry Festival (Feature) 2014(Vancouver)
 WordFest 2012 (Calgary)
 V125PC 2011 (Vancouver)
 National Slam-Legends of Spoken Word 2011 (Toronto)
 Vancouver International Writers Festival '11,'02,'00,'95,'93,'90 (Vancouver)
 Maple Stirrup en El Arco de la virgin 2010 (Barcelona)
 Art 4 Change 2010 (Harlem)
 Festival maelstrÖm reEvolution 2010 (Brussels)
 Blue Met 2009 (Montreal)
 Voix d'Amériques 2008,2005 (Montreal)
 The Raving Poets 2004 (Edmonton)
 Bumbershoot 2003, 1999, 1992, 1991, 1989 (Seattle)
 The World Poetry Bout 2002 (Taos, New Mexico)
 Poetry Africa 2001 (South Africa)
 WordFest 2008, 2000, ’95 (Calgary; Banff)
 Harbourfront Reading Series 1993 (Toronto)
 Small Press Festival 1990 (New York City)

Other highlights
 Women and Words, 2003-2012 (instructor)
 First Time Eyes:  Unearthing Spoken Word, 2007 essay (Canadian Theatre Review)
 Heart of a Poet, 2006, featured poet documentary series
 Bowery Project, 2005 (Instructor), Alberta Scene, 2005 (a commemoration of Alberta's centennial)
 Human Rights Symposium 2005: Victoria
 Sounds Like Canada, 2002 CBC Poet in Residence
 Addicted:  Notes From The Belly Of The Beast, 2001 essay entitled Blackout
 Confessions a Jazz Play, 1991 text of play (Theatrum)

Selected works

Poetry 
 A Love Letter to Emily Carr (2019, Frontenac House Press)
 The Book of Sensations (2017, U of C Press) 
 OPEN LETTER: Woman Against Violence Against Women (2014, Frontenac House Press)
 Goddess Gone Fishing for a Map of the Universe (2012, Frontenac House Press)
 Autopsy of a Turvy World (2008, Frontenac House Press)
 Re:Zoom (2005, Frontenac House Press)
 Between Lovers (2002, Arsenal Pulp Press)
 The Sweet Taste of Lightning (1999, Arsenal Pulp Press)
 Girl’s Guide to Giving Head (1996, Arsenal Pulp Press)
 Swerve (1993, Arsenal Pulp Press)
 Bull Whips and Lambs Wool (1989, Petarade Press)

Editor
 YYC POP: Portraits of People (2020, Frontenac House Press)
 Spoken Word Workbook:Inspiration from Poets who Teach (2011, Banff Centre Press)

CDs
 Dragon Rouge (2017)
 Sweet Taste of Lightning
 Re:Cord

Plays 
 A Love Letter to Emily Carr (2019)
 Confessions: A Jazz Play
 Boy Wonder (with Ballet BC)

References

External links

 Official Website
 Sheri-D Wilson Biography - The Banff Centre

20th-century Canadian poets
21st-century Canadian poets
Canadian women poets
Canadian spoken word poets
Surrealist poets
Living people
Members of the Order of Canada
Poets Laureate of Calgary
20th-century Canadian women writers
21st-century Canadian women writers
Year of birth missing (living people)
Place of birth missing (living people)